The 2022–23 Turkish Women's Football Super League  is the 27th season of Turkey's top women's football league.

A total of 19 teams, which played in the 2021–22 Women's Super League season, will compete in two groups. The league group matches start on 16 October 2022 and end on 5 March 2023, having a half-season break between 18 December 2022 and 8 January 2023. Play-off matches start on 12 March 2023 and end on 30 April 2023.

Teams

Qualifying stage

Group A

Group B

Top goalscorers 
.

Hat-tricks and more 
.

References 

2022
2022–23 domestic women's association football leagues
Women's Super League